Love Is Back is the fifth studio album by Love Unlimited.
The album starts with the track "I'm So Glad That I'm a Woman", an R&B song considered by many a hymn to women, written by Barry White (creator of the group), Frank Wilson and Paul Politi.
Three tracks entered the charts: "I'm So Glad That I'm a Woman", "High Steppin', Hip Dressin' Fella (You Got It Together)" and "If You Want Me, Say It" but  all three songs didn't get to a high position because of promotion problems.

Track listing

1979 albums
Love Unlimited albums